Carman is a small agricultural town of about 3,000 people in the Pembina Valley Region of southern Manitoba, Canada. Carman is at the junction of Highways 3 and 13, 40 minutes southwest of Winnipeg.

Demographics 

Arts and culture
Located in a historic railway station, the Golden Prairie Arts Council facilitates local arts activities. The Carman Active Living Centre (ALC) was established in 2002.

Every April the Canadian Wall of Fame for exceptional violin talent is held. In February (vocal/choral/speech arts and band/instrumental) and April (piano/strings and dance), Carman hosts the Tempo Festival of the Arts. One of Manitoba's longest existing choral groups is the Sonatrice Singers. The group has been meeting and performing since 1972.

Sports
Sports facilities include an ice arena and an 18-hole golf course. The curling club shares clubroom space with golfers. The town contains several baseball diamonds and soccer pitches. Local hockey teams include the Carman Beavers and the Carman Collegiate Cougars.

Education
Carman is home to a University of Manitoba campus as well as the high school Carman Collegiate, Carman Elementary School, Dufferin Christian School, and various Hutterian schools around the area.

Economy
Large agricultural businesses include Aubin Nurseries (perennials, shrubs and trees), and Vanderveens Greenhouses, (annuals) both of which are large Canadian wholesalers of plants.

Events

Carman Country Fair 
The Dufferin Agricultural Society Inc. hosts one of the oldest running fairs in Manitoba; the Carman Country Fair. The fair was established in 1879 and is an affiliate of the Canadian Association of Fairs and Exhibitions.

The three-day event is held annually on the second weekend in July. Events of the fair include 4-H and livestock shows, craft, flower and baking competitions, trade show venues, motor sports shows and a midway, along with entertainment throughout the weekend.

Climate
Carman has a humid continental climate (Dfb). The highest humidex reading in Canada was recorded in Carman in 2007, with an extreme high of 53.

Health services
Carman is a part of the Southern Regional Health Authority.

Carman Memorial Hospital
The 28-bed Carman Memorial Hospital, at 350 - 4th Street S.W. on the south edge of town, was built in 1982 and is served by several doctors and a staff of 75. It provides family medicine, a surgical program, pediatrics, a dietitian service, physiotherapy, diagnostics services, an internal medicine consultant and an in-house pharmacy.

There are two Medical Clinics in the Town of Carman. One clinic imports doctors from neighboring Winkler, Manitoba. The other clinic has two well established doctors (one being a surgeon) who have served Carman for many years.

Emergency services
The Carman Fire Department has approximately 25 volunteer firefighters. The department coverage includes both the Town of Carman and the R.M. of Dufferin.

Carman Ambulance is one of many ambulance services within the Southern Regional Health Authority.

Media

 The Valley Leader (newspaper), is published weekly and delivered to every home in Carman on Thursday. It stopped printing in 2020 and since then The Dufferin Standard has started up
Up until 1964, a 500' transmitter for CBC Radio was in Carman, Manitoba, at which time a new centralized communications tower at Starbuck, Manitoba was constructed to house CBW-AM, CBW-FM, CBWT, and CBWFT. In February, 1952 a small plane with 3 passengers struck the Carman tower due to heavy fog. None of the passengers survived.
Numerous movies have been filmed in and around the Town of Carman, including The Defender (1989), We Were the Mulvaneys (2002), One Week (2008), Make It Happen (2008), The Box Collector (2008), and I Still See You (2018).

Notable people
Ed Belfour, hockey goalie
Jack Carson, actor
Robert Carson, actor
Faouzia, musician
Paul Hiebert, writer
Lynette Loeppky, writer
Wade Allison, hockey player
Frank McKinnon, sports executive

References

External links

The Official Town of Carman Website

Towns in Manitoba
Pembina Valley Region